The 2015 Big Sky Conference softball tournament will be held at Miller Ranch Stadium on the campus of Idaho State University in Pocatello, Idaho from May 7 through May 9, 2015. The tournament will earn the Big Sky Conference's automatic bid to the 2015 NCAA Division I softball tournament. The entire tournament will air on Watch Big Sky with Jason Ashcraft describing the action.

Tournament

All times listed are Mountain Daylight Time.

Big Sky Conference softball tournament
Big Sky Tournament